Moodu Mullu is a 1983 Indian Telugu-language romantic comedy film written and directed by Jandhyala. It is a remake of the 1983 Tamil film Mundhanai Mudichu. The film stars Chandramohan and Raadhika. It was released on 9 September 1983 and emerged a commercial success.

Plot

Cast 
 Chandramohan as Master-u
 Raadhika as Gowri
 Geetha as Master-us colleague
Nalinikanth as Ratnam
Kanta Rao as President Dharmayya
Kota Sreenivasa Rao as the Pujari

Production 
Moodu Mullu is a remake of the 1983 Tamil film Mundhanai Mudichu. It was directed by Jandhyala who also wrote the screenplay. AVM Productions, the producers of the original, produced the remake in association with Sri Saradhi Studios. Cinematography was handled by S. Gopal Reddy, and editing by Gautham Raju. The film eschewed many double entendre/suggestive dialogues from Mundhanai Mudichu. Principal photography took place in and around Amalapuram and West Godavari district, in a single schedule that lasted between 30 and 40 working days.

Soundtrack 
The soundtrack was composed by Rajan–Nagendra, with lyrics by Veturi and Jyothirmayi.

Release and reception 
Moodu Mullu was released on 9 September 1983, and was commercially successful.

References

External links 
 

1980s Telugu-language films
1983 films
1983 romantic comedy films
AVM Productions films
Films directed by Jandhyala
Films scored by Rajan–Nagendra
Indian romantic comedy films
Telugu remakes of Tamil films